Yitzhak "Vicky" Peretz (11 February 1953 – 29 June 2021) was an Israeli Olympic football player who played for the Israel national team, and manager. He played for Maccabi Ramat Amidar, Maccabi Tel Aviv, Strasbourg, Rennes, Maccabi Tel Aviv, Shimshon Tel Aviv, Beitar Netanya, Hapoel Lod, and Maccabi HaShikma Ramat Hen. He earned a gold medal playing for Team Israel at the 1973 Maccabiah Games, and in 1976 he played for the Israel national football team in the Montreal Olympics.

Personal life
Peretz was born in Kfar Saba, Israel. He later lived in Ramat Gan, Israel. 

His son, Omer, has followed in his father's footsteps. His brother in law was Avi Cohen, former international footballer, and his nephew is Tamir Cohen. Peretz died at 68 years of age on 29 June 2021, apparently by suicide.

Playing career
Peretz was the leading scorer of the Israel national under-19 football team that competed at the 1972 Asian Football Conference Youth Championship. His 12 goals gave him the golden boot title of the tournament.

He began his career in the Maccabi Ramat Amidar youth department. Peretz then played for its first team, turning professional in 1971. 

Peretz signed at 20 years of age with Maccabi Tel Aviv in 1973 -- playing with them for the next seven years, and that season he was the team's top scorer with 19 goals. He was Liga Leumit's top scorer with 17 goals in the 1976-77 season in which Maccabi won the title. With Maccabi in 1978-79 campaign, he had 17 goals across all competitions.

He earned a gold medal playing for Team Israel at the 1973 Maccabiah Games. In 1976 Peretz played for the Israel national football team in the Montreal Olympics.

In 1980, Peretz left Israel to join French side RC Strasbourg. Over the next two years he scored 27 goals in 71 appearances in France’s premier league.

Peretz then moved to France's Stade Rennais two years later. He scored 17 goals in 33 appearances with the team in 1982-83. 

In 1983, he returned to Maccabi Tel Aviv for two more seasons. With the club, Peretz had a total of 101 goals in 250 appearances in all competitions, ranking him 8th among all-time scorers for the club.

In 1985 Peretz switched to Shimshon Tel Aviv, playing for them in 1985-86.  Over the following years he played for  Beitar Netanya (1986), Hapoel Lod (1986-87), and Maccabi HaShikma Ramat Hen.  He retired in 1991. 

During his playing career with the Israeli national team from 1973 to 1983 Peretz won 40 caps, scoring 14 goals.

Coaching career

Peretz was Assistant Manager for Hapoel Tel Aviv from 1997 to 1999. He coached the Israeli under-16 national youth football team from 2003-05.

In 2006, he was appointed Assistant Manager at Maccabi Tel Aviv. Peretz left the club in 2007. He coached Maccabi HaShikma Ramat Hen in 2008, and Hakoah Ramat Gan in 2009.

Honours
 Israeli Premier League: 1976–77, 1978–79
 Israel State Cup: 1977
 Israel Super Cup: 1979

See also
List of foreign Ligue 1 players: I
List of Israel international footballers
List of RC Strasbourg Alsace players

References

External links

1953 births
2021 deaths
Association football forwards
Competitors at the 1973 Maccabiah Games
Expatriate footballers in France
Israeli Jews
Israeli footballers
Footballers from Kfar Saba
Israeli expatriate sportspeople in France
Israel international footballers
Jewish footballers
Olympic footballers of Israel
Footballers at the 1976 Summer Olympics
Maccabi Ramat Amidar F.C. players
Maccabi Tel Aviv F.C. players
Maccabiah Games gold medalists for Israel
Maccabiah Games medalists in football
RC Strasbourg Alsace players
Stade Rennais F.C. players
Shimshon Tel Aviv F.C. players
Suicides in Israel
Hapoel Lod F.C. players
Maccabi HaShikma Ramat Hen F.C. players
Liga Leumit players
Ligue 1 players